Elena Sadiku (born 6 November 1993) is a Swedish former football midfielder. She was an Under-19 international.

She started her career with LdB Malmö, before moving to Kristianstads DFF and Eskilstuna United.

Sadiku suffered a knee injury in July 2014. She scored a hat-trick in her comeback game a year later, only to suffer another serious knee injury a few days later. She was unable to play in 2016 and after suffering from depression, left Eskilstuna at the end of the season. Shortly afterwards, newly-promoted Hammarby announced that they had signed Sadiku and were hoping she could overcome her injuries and recapture her best form. She played 6 games for Hammarby in 2017, scoring once, before retiring due to recurring problems with injuries.

In February 2018 Sadiku accepted a coaching role with Chinese Women's Super League club Beijing BG Phoenix.

References

External links
 
 

1993 births
Living people
Swedish women's footballers
Kosovo Albanians
FC Rosengård players
Kristianstads DFF players
Damallsvenskan players
Eskilstuna United DFF players
Hammarby Fotboll (women) players
Women's association football midfielders
Swedish expatriates in China
Sweden women's youth international footballers